Lucius Aemilius Paullus (died 2 August 216 BC), also spelled Paulus, was a Roman consul twice, in 219 and 216 BC.

Biography 
Paullus shared his first consulship with Marcus Livius Salinator. During this year, he defeated Demetrius of Pharos in the Second Illyrian War, and forced him to flee to the court of Philip V of Macedon. On his return to Rome, he was awarded a triumph. He was subsequently charged, along with his colleague, with unfairly dividing the spoils, although he was acquitted.

During the Second Punic War, Paullus was made consul a second time and served with Gaius Terentius Varro. He shared the command of the army with Varro at the Battle of Cannae. Varro led out the troops against the advice of Paullus and the battle became a crushing defeat for the Romans. Paullus died in the battle, while Varro managed to escape.

In Silius Italicus' epic poem Punica, Paullus is described as killing the Carthaginian commander Viriathus prior to his own death.

Paullus was the father of Lucius Aemilius Paullus Macedonicus and his daughter, Aemilia Tertia, married Scipio Africanus.

See also
 Scipio-Paullus-Gracchus family tree

Notes

216 BC deaths
3rd-century BC diplomats
3rd-century BC Roman consuls
Paullus, Lucius 535
Pontifices
Roman commanders of the Second Punic War
Roman consuls who died in office
Roman generals killed in action
Roman triumphators
Year of birth unknown